De Graeff (also:  De Graef, Graef, Graeff, Graaff, Graaf and De Graeff van Polsbroek) is an old Dutch patrician and noble family,

The Amsterdam line of the family played an important role during the Dutch Golden Age. They were at the centre of Amsterdam and Holland public life and oligarchy from 1578 until 1672, and belonged to the Dutch States Party. During that time, members of the De Graeff family were also important patrons of art and artists such as Rembrandt, Govaert Flinck, Gerard ter Borch, Jacob van Ruisdael, Caspar Netscher, Gerard de Lairesse, Artus Quellinus and Joost van den Vondel.

In 1677 they were made knights of the Holy Roman Empire. Since 1885 that line has been part of the Dutch nobility with the honorific of jonkheer.

Origin 
According to an unconfirmed family tradition, the family descends from the Austrian Lords Von Graben. Allegedly one Wolfgang von Graben came 1483 to Holland. It is said that the family was founded by  Pieter Graeff (born around 1484) who may lived at the Amsterdam area. He was married to Griet Pietersdr Berents  
descendant from Wouter Berensz and his wife Dieuwer Willemsz de Grebber, called Berents, of the De Grebber family, baljuws of the Waterland, and Willem Eggert, stadtholder of Holland. The Berents family belonged to the Amsterdam patriciate and low nobility and inherited the fief Randenbroek (Amersfoort) from the De Grebber.

Historical and political Legacy 
 

Cornelis de Graeff (1599-1664) said that the ancient Amsterdammers had no habit of keeping genealogical records of their families, and knew no more of their generation than what they have learned from their fathers and grandfathers. The dates of his own family in Amsterdam do not go back very far:

And first I'll start with the family de Graven from which I descended on my father's side. This is a family from Amsterdam, coming from the house 'de Keijser', that was located at the Waeter (= now Damrak No. 91). This house shows the impression of its vaulted appearance, owned by Jan Pieters de Graeff, and then by Dirck Jans de Graeff, who also sold this house. My father Jacob de Graeff and his brothers were also born here.

The De Graeff family has therefore never boasted about the age of their own family in Amsterdam. But Cornelis and his brother Andries de Graeff (1611-1678), together with their cousins Andries and Cornelis Bicker, saw themselves as the political heirs of the old regent family Boelens, whose main lineage, which had remained catholic, had died out in the male line in 1647. They had received the very significant first names Andries and Cornelis from their Boelens ancestors. As in a real dynasty, members of the two families frequently intermarried in the 17th century in order to keep their political and commercial capital together. Its great historical ancestor was Andries Boelens (1455-1519), the city's most influential medieval mayor. Both families, Bicker and De Graeff, descend in the female line from Boelens. He was allowed to hold the highest office in Amsterdam fifteen times.

Progenitor Pieter Graeff 
Pieter Graeff was probably born around 1484. His alleged father Wolfgang von Graben (1465-1521) was recorded in Holland in 1483, and that he had Pieter as a son. It cannot be determined whether Pieter was born in Amsterdam. Biographical cornerstones of his life cannot be determined, but it is reported that he married Griet Pieters(dr) Berents in 1512, a woman whose family came from the patriciate of Amsterdam and the low nobility of the area. She may was a daughter of Berend Berends, in 1509 advisor of Amsterdam, himself a son or second line descendant (grandson, nephew) of Jan Berents, Lord of Randenbroek (Amersfoort), the son of Wouter Berensz and his wife Dieuwer Willemsdr de Grebber (born around 1385 or later), called Berents, of the De Grebber family, baljuws of the Waterland. The Berents family inherited the fief Randenbroek from the De Grebber.

Griet Pietersdr Berents came from the female line of this family, and through the marriage of her ancestor Willem Grebber Jonge Willem Grebberszoon (born around 1362–1434; father of Dieuwer Willemsdr de Grebber) to Lijsbeth Willemsdr Eggert (born around 1390 or later; also named Imme Eggert), she was also a descendant of Lijsbeths father Willem Eggert (1360-1417), stadholder of Holland.

Pieter and Griet had one son, Jan Pietersz Graeff, who continued the family line in Amsterdam. His coat of arms from 1542 or 1543 shows the shovel of the Von Graben and the swan of the De Grebber family.

About the family crest of Pieter's wife Griet: Jan Berents, Lord of Randenbroek, the ancestor of Griet Pietersdr Berents, had a coat of arms which hangs in a chapel in the Nieuwe Kerk of Amsterdam. It shows a quartered shield with the arms of the Berents, De Grebber, Eggert and Boel (Boelens Loen). During the 15th and 16th centuries, these families were at the head of the Amsterdam patriciate and, with the exception of the Boelens, belonged to the knightly nobility.

Family lines 
 Amsterdam line (so called main line, includes the Free Lords of Polsbroek, Purmerland and Ilpendam)
 Alblasserdam line
 Lines at Alkmaar, Leiden and Delft
 Illegitimate Line 'Graeff'
 (?) Line in Prussia
 South African line (founded in 1850)
 The Hague line (since 19th century)

Amsterdam line

Beginning 
Pieter's line was continued by his only known son, Jan Pietersz Graeff (before 1512–1553). It is known that he lived in Amsterdam in the "Huis De Keyser" (named after the "Keizerskroon" attached outside the building) on the Damrak. There he ran a flourishing cloth trade. In 1542 he became a councilor and in 1543 he was appointed alderman (Schepen) of Amsterdam. Due to its political activities, the De Graeff family is one of the few patrician families to sit in government before and after the Amsterdam Alteratie of 1578. Jan Pietersz Graeff had five sons. The second-born Lenaert Jansz de Graeff was a leading member of the Amsterdam Reformed Church, and involved in the religious liberation struggle of the Netherlands in the 1560s and 1570s; on the one hand he was one of the military and religious leaders of Amsterdam under his friend Hendrick von Brederode and probably as "Monseigneur de Graeff" captain of the watergeus who were involved in the Capture of Brielle in 1572. In recent historical books, De Graeff is treated as one of the leaders of the Sea beggars. His character was also used in a historical novel about De Grote Geus.
His third son Dirck Jansz Graeff (1532-1589) continued the main line of the family in Amsterdam. As governing mayor of Amsterdam and friend of William I of Orange (William the Silent), he was able to lay the foundation for the family's political and social influence in Amsterdam. Dirk Jansz was one of the emigrants who fled to Emden from the Spanish army under the Duke of Alba. After his return, Dirck Jansz had shares in over 100 merchant ships. In the years 1584/1585 he was the richest resident of Amsterdam with a fortune of 140,000 guilders.

Dutch Golden Age 

During the Dutch Golden Age, the De Graeff family was critical of the influence of the House of Orange. the De Graeffs belonged to the republican political movement of the Regenten, also referred to as the ‘state oriented’, as opposed to the Royalists. Together with the Republican political leaders, the Bicker family and Grand Pensionary Johan de Witt, the republican-minded Jacob Dircksz de Graeff (son of Dirck Jansz Graeff) and his sons Cornelis and Andries de Graeff strived for the abolition of stadtholdership. They desired the full sovereignty of the individual regions in a form in which the Republic of the United Seven Netherlands was not ruled by a single person. Instead of a sovereign (or stadtholder) the political and military power was lodged with the States General and with the regents of the cities in Holland. The De Graeff and Bicker families, for example, tried to imitate the centralistic, autocratic style of government of the Florentine Medici. The Dutch historian and archivist Bas Dudok van Heel said about the power of families like that of de Graeff and Bicker: In Florence, families like Bicker and De Graeff would have been uncrowned princes.

During the two decades from the 1650 to the 1670s the De Graeff family had a leading role in the Amsterdam administration, the city was at the peak of its political power. This period was also referred to by Republicans as the ‘Ware Vrijheid’ (True Freedom). It was the First Stadtholderless Period which lasted from 1650 to 1672 during these twenty years, the regents from Holland and in particular those of Amsterdam, controlled the republic. The city was flush with self-confidence and liked to compare itself to the famous Republic of Rome. Even without a stadtholder, things seemed to be going well for the Republic and its regents both politically and economically.

In early 1671, Andries de Graeff was once again put forward as chief-mayor (regent) and managed to gain control with his Republican faction. During the winter of that year it seemed as if – at least in Amsterdam – the Republicans were winning. It was an exceptionally opportune moment to commission a monumental ceiling painting on Amsterdam's independent position for the ‘Sael’ of his mayor's residence. De Graeff had a clear message in mind for the ceiling painting: the ‘Ware Vrijheid’ of the Republic was only protected by the Republican regents of Amsterdam. The paintings by Gerard de Lairesse glorify the de Graeff family's role as the protector of the Republican state, defender of ‘Freedom’. The work of art can be viewed as a visual statement opposing the return of House of Orange as Stadtholders of the republic.

In Rampjaar 1672, when the Orangists took power again, the De Graeffs lost their position as one of the key States party families.

Patrons of the arts 

Throughout the Dutch Golden Age, the family sponsored art and architecture, and were responsible for the majority of Amsterdam art. Andries de Graeff, the first patron of the arts in the family, aided Rembrandt and, together with his brother Cornelis de Graeff, commissioned Govert Flinck, Artus Quellinus and Jacob Jordaens for the construction of the city hall on the Dam in 1655. Andries de Graeff's other notable artistic associates included Gerard ter Borch, Flinck, and Jan Lievens. Andries' brother Cornelis continued in the family tradition of patronizing artists, commissioning works from Jacob van Ruisdael, Nicolaes Eliaszoon Pickenoy, Quellinus, Flinck and Caspar Netscher. The family were also patrons of the poets Joost van den Vondel, Jan Vos, Caspar Barlaeus und Gerard Brandt.

In 1660 Andries and his brother Cornelis de Graeff organized the Dutch Gift, a collection of 28 mostly Italian Renaissance paintings and 12 classical sculptures, which was presented to King Charles II of England by the States-General of the Netherlands in 1660. The gift was made to mark his return to power in the English Restoration. The De Graeffs intended to strengthen diplomatic relations between England and the Republic, but only a few years after the gift the two nations would be at war again in the Second Anglo-Dutch War of 1665–67.

Cornelis' son Pieter de Graeff was also a man who surrounded himself with art and beauty. He was an art collector and patron to the artists Ter Borch, Lievens, Karel Dujardin, Romeyn de Hooghe, Netscher and the poet Van den Vondel. Prof. C.W. Fock of the University of Leiden describes his art collection and lifestyle in her work Het stempel van de bewoner.

After the Golden Age 
After the Amsterdam family De Graeff had lost their political importance in Rampjaar 1672, they were only able to establish themselves to a limited extent in Amsterdam and Dutch politics. During the 18th century, three more family members where part of the City administration, namely Johan de Graeff (1673-1714), Gerrit de Graeff (1711-1752) and Gerrit II de Graeff van Zuid-Polsbroek (1741-1811). During the 19th century the last one and his grandson, the manufacturer Gerrit IV de Graeff (1797–1870), where part of the Amsterdam government. In the 20th century, the family had completely disappeared from city politics, and the Hague Line had taken over the family's political and social leadership.

Nobility 
In 1677, Andries de Graeff and his only son, Cornelis, became a knight of the Holy Roman Empire. They traced their descent from Wolfgang von Graben, member of the Austrian noble House of Graben von Stein, which was an apparent (or illegitimate) branch of the House of Meinhardin.
Diplom loaned to Mr. Andries de Graeff, Vienna, July 19, 1677:

Fide digis itegur genealogistarum Amsteldamensium edocti testimoniis te Andream de Graeff [Andries de Graeff] non paternum solum ex pervetusta in Comitatu nostro Tyrolensi von Graben dicta familia originem ducere, qua olim per quendam ex ascendentibus tuis ejus nominis in Belgium traducta et in Petrum de Graeff [Pieter Graeff], abavum, Johannem [Jan Pietersz Graeff], proavum, Theodorum [Dirck Jansz Graeff], avum, ac tandem Jacobum [Jacob Dircksz de Graeff], patrem tuum, viros in civitate, Amstelodamensi continua serie consulatum scabinatus senatorii ordinis dignitabitus conspicuos et in publicum bene semper meritos propagata nobiliter et cum splendore inter suos se semper gessaerit interque alios honores praerogativasque nobilibus eo locorum proprias liberum venandi jus in Hollandia, Frisiaque occidentale ac Ultrajectina provinciis habuerit semper et exercuerit.

This title only existed for one year, since both title holders died in the following year. 

When the Kingdom of the United Netherlands was established in 1815, the De Graeff family received no recognition or elevation to the new Dutch nobility, as Dutch historian and archivist Bas Dudok van Heel put it this way: In Florence families like Bicker and De Graeff would have been uncrowned princes. Here, in 1815, they should at least have been raised to the rank of count, but the southern Dutch nobility would not have put up with that. What you got here remained nothing half and nothing whole.

In 1885 Dirk de Graeff van Polsbroek received the new Dutch nobility with the predicate Jonkheer for himself and his descendants. This noble branch still flourishes today.

Feudality 

Like many other Dutch patrician families, the De Graeffs endeavored to adopt the way of life and the social appearance of the old dutch nobility and to be recognized by them as equals. Among other things, the acquisition of feudal manorial estates, so-called heerlijkheid, served to justify such claims. which in the Netherlands were also associated with their own jurisdiction. In the case of "lower fiefs" (lage heerlijkheiden or Ambachtsheerlijkheid), this was the lower jurisdiction, while the landlord of a "free" or "high fief" also had high jurisdiction (blood court).

Jacob Dircksz de Graeff was one of the first Dutch regents to come into possession of such grandeur. In 1610 he bought the Free and high fief of Zuid-Polsbroek (hoge of vrije heerlijkheid Zuid-Polsbroek) for himself and his family from Charles de Ligne, prince Aremberg, which at that time was no longer a fiefdom but was freely inheritable and sellable as an allod property. Their acquisition increased the reputation and contributed to the aristocratization of the family, in which De Graeff and his heirs could be addressed as Vrijheer(en) van Zuid-Polsbroek ever since. Furthermore, in 1678 his grandson Jacob de Graeff inherited the Free or high Lordship of Purmerland and Ilpendam (hoge heerlijkheid van Purmerland en Ilpendam). The mansions of Zuid-Polsbroek, Purmerland and Ilpendam were owned by the De Graeff family until 1870.

Furthermore, Pieter Dircksz Graeff (1573-1645) owned the Lordship of Engelenburg. The siblings Alida (1651-1738) and Arnoldina de Graeff (1652-1703) had been vrijvrouwen of the Free and High Lordship Jaarsveld during the 17th and 18th century.

Likewise, the De Graeff family held Ambachtsheerlijkheiden as fiefdoms of the city of Amsterdam during the 17th century; Amstelveen, Nieuwer-Amstel, Sloten, Sloterdijk and Osdorp, Urk and Emmeloord.

The family had lands and feudal rights in the southern part of Netelenburg, in Duinen in North Holland, in Cromwyk and Hoog Rietveld near Woerden, near Langerak and on the river Lek, the extensive country estates Vredenhof near Voorschoten and Valckeveen (Valkenburg), the later Graeffenveld near Oud-Naarden. Furthermore the held Land in De Graskamp and grounds in Soestdijk, Soestdijk Palace, and Baarn.

Coat of arms 
The ancient Graeff coat of arms shows the shovel from the Herren von Graben and the swan from the De Grebber family from Waterland (county of Holland). The inheritance of the Graben coat of arms is based on the (assumed) male descent of the Graeff-ancestor Pieter Graeff (born around 1484) from Wolfgang von Graben. The inheritance of the Grebber coat of arms on the female lineage of Pieter's wife Griet Pietersdr Berents of the 'Berents-De Grebber line'.

Symbols of the coat of arms:
 Shovel: Von Graben 
 Swan: De Grebber and the 2nd one since the earlier 17th century stands for the Fief of Vredenhof
 Falcon: Fief of Valkenburg (Valckeveen) 
 Rhombus: High Lordship of Zuid-Polsbroek 
 Goose: High Lordship of Purmerland 
 Lion: High Lordship of Ilpendam

Coat of arms Pieter de Graeff 
The coat of arms of Pieter de Graeff (1638-1707) is quartered with a heart shield and since 1678 it shows the following symbols:

 heart shield shows the three silver rhombuses on red (originally from the family Van Woerdern van Vliet) of the High Lordship Zuid-Polsbroek
 field 1 (left above) shows the silver shovel on red of their paternal ancestors, the Herren von Graben
 field 2 (right above) shows the silver swan on blue of the Fief Vredenhof or that one (Waterland) of one of their maternal ancestors, the De Grebber
 field 3 (left below) shows the silver goose in blue of Purmerland (High Lordship Purmerland and Ilpendam)
 field 4 (right below) shows the red and black lions on gold (the arms of the County of Holland) for Ilpendam (High Lordship Purmerland and Ilpendam) above a blue area
 shield holders are two silver swans
 helmet covers in red and silver
 helm adornment shows an upright silver spade with ostrich feathers (Herren von Graben)
 motto: MORS SCEPTRA LIGONIBUS AEQUAT (DEATH MAKES SEPTRES AND HOES EQUAL)

Other Dutch lines 
Secondary lines split off from Jacob Jansz Graeff († ca. 1580), the youngest son of Jan Pietersz Graeff. These lived in the cities of Alblasserdam, Alkmaar, Leiden and Delft, but could not gain influence like those who remained in Amsterdam. The best-known member was the Dutch Rear Admiral Albert Claesz de Graeff, a great-grandson of Jacob Jansz Graeff. It is not known whether there are still male descendants from these branches today.

There are also descendants of Jacob Jansz Graeff's († ca. 1580) illegitimate son Adriaan Jacobsz Graeff, but nothing further is known about their life.

Old German Empire 

According to the Rietstap Armorial Général, the (De) Graeff coat of arms was also used by bearers in former Prussia (Germany) as Graaff (de), Prusse - Orig. de Hollande (also spelled de Graaf), but these are not chronologically identifiable. The coat of arms is described in the original as follows: Graaff (de) Prusse - Orig. de Hollande - Écartelé aux 1 et 4 de gueules à une bêche d'argent le fer en haut aux 2 et 3 d'azur à un cygne d'argent Cimier la bêche sommée de trois plumes de paon au naturel Lambrequin d'argent et de gueules. Since the blazon next to the spade describes a swan [and not a goose which the De Graeff's used from 1655 to 1678 as (Vrij)heeren van Purmerland en Ilpendam instead of the swan], it is probably a descent from the Amsterdam lineage before a separation of their property in 1638 (the death of Jacob Dircksz de Graeff). Since the Amsterdam line consists of identifiable members throughout, they are probably descendants of a family member of that line from the second half of the 16th century.

South African line 
The lineage in South Africa descends from Gerrit Arnold Theodoor de Graeff (b. 1831), a brother of Dirk de Graeff van Polsbroek. This line is still thriving today.

The Hague line 
Other lines and branches, also from the Amsterdam main line, are scattered throughout the Netherlands, such as The Hague line. This came from the important diplomat Dirk de Graeff van Polsbroek (1833-1916). He was Dutch Consul General and Minister-Resident to Japan and due his relationship with Emperor Meiji he laid the foundation for modern diplomatic representation in Japan of various European States. In 1885 he received the new Dutch nobility with the predicate Jonkheer for himself and his descendants. This noble branch still flourishes today. Dirk's son was Andries Cornelis Dirk de Graeff, diplomat, minister and governor-general, who was able to continue the politically committed and successful tradition of his family in the 20th century. Various family members were also active in engineering, in the water authorities, as state inspectors and commissioners, directors, in court service at the Dutch royal court and as financial and company managers. Representatives of this are Dirk Georg de Graeff and Jan Jaap de Graeff.

Nobility 
Some members of the line at The Hague belonged to the New Dutch nobility. In 1885 Dirk de Graeff van Polsbroek, originally from the Amsterdam branch, received the predicate Jonkheer for himself and his descendants. This noble branch, descendanted from Dirk, still flourishes today.

Family members (selection) 

 Pieter Graeff (born around 1484), it is said that he was a son of Wolfgang von Graben (1465-1521) → Amsterdam line
 Jan Pietersz Graeff (1512–1553), member of the vroedschap and advisor of Amsterdam, cloth merchant and dealer
 Lenaert Jansz de Graeff (1530–35 - before 1578), one of the leaders of the Protestant Reformation at Amsterdam, friend of the "Grote Geus" Henry, Count of Bréderode; Lenaert Jansz de Graeff could be ident with "Monseigneur de Graeff", a captain of the Sea Beggars during the Capture of Brielle.
 Diederik Jansz. Graeff (1532–1589), mayor of Amsterdam, merchant; Graeff was also a friend of William the Silent, Prince of Orange.
 Jacob Dircksz de Graeff (1570–1638), was an illustrious member of the De Graeff family; regent and mayor of Amsterdam, lord of the semisouverain fief Zuid-polsbroek, lord of the manor of Sloten, Osdorp and Amstelveen.
 Cornelis de Graeff (1599–1664), was the most illustrious member of the De Graeff family; regent and  mayor of Amsterdam, lord of the semi-sovereign fief Zuid-polsbroek, lord of the manor of Sloten and Amstelveen, President of the Dutch East Indies Company (VOC); illustrious Patron and Art collector.
 Pieter de Graeff (1638–1707), regent of Amsterdam, lord of the semi-sovereign fiefs of Zuid-polsbroek, Purmerland and Ilpendam, President or Chairman of the Dutch East Indies Company (VOC), friend, advicor to his cousin Johan de Witt.
 Cornelis de Graeff II. (1671–1719), lord of the semi-sovereign fief Purmerland and Ilpendam.
 Johan de Graeff (1673–1714), advisor of Amsterdam, lord of the semi-sovereign fief Zuid-polsbroek.
 Gerrit de Graeff (I.) van Zuid-Polsbroek (1711–1752), regent of Amsterdam, lord of the semi-sovereign fiefs of Zuid-polsbroek, Purmerland and Ilpendam, one of the Chairmen of the Dutch East Indies Company (VOC) and the Dutch West Indies Company (WIC).
 Joan de Graeff (1735-1754), lord of the (semi-sovereign) fief of Zuid-Polsbroek
 Gerrit de Graeff II. (1741–1811), regent of Amsterdam, lord of the (semi-sovereign) fiefs of Zuid-polsbroek, Purmerland and Ilpendam.
 Gerrit de Graeff (III.) van Zuid-Polsbroek (1766–1814), lord of the fiefs of Zuid-polsbroek, Purmerland and Ilpendam.
 Gerrit de Graeff (IV.) van Zuid-Polsbroek (1797–1870), lord of the fiefs of Zuid-polsbroek, Purmerland and Ilpendam, advisor of the city of Amsterdam.
 Gerrit Arnold Theodoor de Graeff (born 1831) → South African line 
 Henry George de Graeff van Polsbroek (1858–1941)
 Dirk de Graeff van Polsbroek (1833–1916), Diplomat, Generalconsul and Dutch minister in Japan. He was the most important representative of the Dutch government and played a major part in the many negotiations between Japan and various Western countries. De Graeff van Polsbroek was advisor to Japanese Emperor Meiji and laid the foundation stone for a modern western (European) diplomacy  in Japan. → The Hague line
 Andries Cornelis Dirk de Graeff (1872–1958), Governor General of Dutch East Indies, Dutch minister for foreign affairs.
 Jacob de Graeff (born 1921)
 Jan Jaap de Graeff (born 1949), dijkgraaf of Schieland, chamberlain of the Dutch queen, director of the Dutch unie for water
 Géorg de Graeff (1873–1954)
 Dirk Georg de Graeff (1905–1986), chamberlain of the Dutch queens and managing director from the Algemene Bank Nederland
 Herman Jacob de Graeff (1907-1978)
 Egbert de Graeff (1936–2017), Dutch field hockey player
 Jacob de Graeff (1642–1690), advisor of Amsterdam, lord of the semi-sovereign fief Purmerland and Ilpendam.
 Dirk de Graeff (1601–1637), advisor of Amsterdam
 Agneta de Graeff van Polsbroek (1603–1656), mother of Wendela Bicker and mother in law of Johan de Witt.
 Wendela de Graeff (1607–1652), painted by Rembrandt van Rijn at his masterpiece Jacob Blessing the Children of Joseph
 Andries de Graeff (1611–1678), had together with his brother Cornelis the leading role in the Amsterdam and Holland administration; minister of finances, regent and mayor of Amsterdam, lord of the manor of Urk and Emmeloord; illustrious Patron and Art collector.
 Cornelis HrR Ridder de Graeff (1650–1678), free imperial knight of the Holy Roman Empire, chieflandholder of the Zijpe and Haze Polder.
 Pieter Dircksz Graeff (1573–1645), lord of Engelenburg, member of the vroedschap of Amsterdam, visited the Holy Sepulchre in Jerusalem.
 Jacob Jansz Graeff (died ca 1580) → Ablasserdam line
 Jan Jacobsz Graeff (born ca 1570–75)
 Claes Jansz Graeff
 Albert Claesz de Graeff (born around 1620), Dutch Admiral (Schout-bij-nacht)

See also 
 De Graeff family tree
 Semisouverain fief of Zuid-Polsbroek
 Fief of Purmerend, Purmerland and Ilpendam
 Ilpenstein Castle
 Herengracht 573
 Soestdijk Palace

Notes

Literature 
 Bruijn, J. H. De. Genealogie van het geslacht De Graeff van Polsbroek 1529/1827.
 Burke, P. (1994). Venice and Amsterdam: A Study of Seventeenth-Century Élites.
 Graeff, P. De (P. de Graeff Gerritsz en Dirk de Graeff van Polsbroek). Genealogie van de familie De Graeff van Polsbroek Amsterdam 1882.
 Israel, Jonathan I. (1995). The Dutch Republic: Its Rise, Greatness, and Fall 1477–1806. Clarendon Press, Oxford, 
 Rowen, Herbert H. (1986). John de Witt" Statesman of the "True Freedom". Cambridge University Press, 
 Zandvliet, Kees. De 250 rijksten van de Gouden Eeuw - Kapitaal, macht, familie en levensstijl (2006 Amsterdam; Nieuw Amsterdam Uitgevers)

External links 

 "Genealogie van het geslacht 'de Graeff' door W. H. Croockewit" (Family tree of the De Graeff family) at: De Nederlandsche leeuw: tijdschrift van het Koninklijk Nederlandsch Genootschap voor Geslacht- en Wapenkunde (1895-1900).

 
Dutch noble families
Dutch families
Dutch patrician families